MC Tee Vee was a music program that was broadcast on Australia's SBS TV television network in the early- to mid-1990s. It was a 30-minute dance music video showcase hosted by Annette Shun Wah.

The program was the first, and to this day the only, Australian music program dedicated to dance, rap and house music.

See also
 List of Australian music television shows

Australian music television series
Special Broadcasting Service original programming
1990s Australian television series